Escualosa is a genus of fishes in the herring family, Clupeidae.  The genus currently contains two described species.

Species 
 Escualosa elongata Wongratana, 1983 (Slender white sardine)
 Escualosa thoracata (Valenciennes, 1847) (White sardine)

References
 

 
Marine fish genera
Taxa named by Gilbert Percy Whitley